Eric Schwartz may refer to:

Eric Schwartz (comedian), American comedian, musician and actor
Eric Schwartz (songwriter), American singer/songwriter and musical satirist
Eric L. Schwartz (born 1947), American neuroscientist
Eric P. Schwartz, former United States Assistant Secretary of State for Population, Refugees, and Migration